New Turkish Cinema: Belonging, Identity and Memory is a 2010 I.B. Tauris publication by Istanbul Technical University Associate Professor Asuman Suner which examines the emergence of the new wave Turkish cinema, including both commercial and independent productions, against the backdrop of the drastic transformation undergone by Turkey since the mid-1990s and how these films persistently return to the themes of belonging, identity and memory.

Content

Introduction
The author briefly outlines the history of Turkish cinema in order to place the emergence of new Turkish cinema in into historical and cultural context.

Chapter 1: Popular Nostalgia Films
New popular Turkish films focusing on the provincial small-town life of the past, which voice a critique of modern Turkish society through an idealized representation of the past as a time of collective childhood, are discussed by the author, who finds this critique problematic, however, as it renders society unaccountable for the events of the past and alleviates it from the burden of responsibility.

Filmography
 Propaganda (1999) directed by Sinan Çetin
 Offside (2000)  directed by Serdar Akar
 The Waterfall (2001) directed by Semir Aslanyürek
 Vizontele (2001) directed by Yılmaz Erdoğan and Ömer Faruk Sorak
 Vizontele Tuuba (2004) directed by Yılmaz Erdoğan
 My Father and My Son (2005) directed by Çağan Irmak
 The International (2006) directed by Muharrem Gülmez and Sırrı Süreyya Önder

Chapter 2: New Political Films
The new wave of Turkish political films, which show the effect on normal people of the country's traumatic recent past (including police brutality, disappearances, repression of religious and ethnic minorities and the Kurdish–Turkish conflict), are discussed by the author, who argues these films interrogate questions of national identity and belonging in common with transnational cinema.

Filmography
 Journey to the Sun (1999) directed by Yeşim Ustaoğlu
 In Nowhere Land (2002) directed by Tayfun Pirselimoğlu
 Mud (2003) directed by Derviş Zaim
 Waiting for the Clouds (2003) directed by Yeşim Ustaoğlu
 Toss-Up (2004) directed by Uğur Yücel

Chapter 3: The Cinema of Nuri Bilge Ceylan
The films of the Cannes Grand Jury Prize-winning auteur-filmmaker Nuri Bilge Ceylan, arguably the most internationally acclaimed director of new Turkish cinema, are discussed by the author,  who claims that they are mainly about acknowledging the paradoxes of home and belonging.

Filmography
 Cocoon (1995) directed by Nuri Bilge Ceylan
 Small Town (1998) directed by Nuri Bilge Ceylan
 Clouds of May (2000) directed by Nuri Bilge Ceylan
 Distant (2002) directed by Nuri Bilge Ceylan
 Climates (2006) directed by Nuri Bilge Ceylan

Chapter 4: The Cinema of Zeki Demirkubuz
The films of prominent auteur-filmmaker Zeki Demirkubuz, which centre on characters who are agitated or detached, draw upon highly-dramatic and violent events, and use compulsive repetition in the narrative, are discussed by the author, who claims they direct attention to the dark underside of domesticity and the home.

Filmography
 Block C (1994) directed by Zeki Demirkubuz
 Innocence (1997) directed by Zeki Demirkubuz
 The Third Page (1999) directed by Zeki Demirkubuz
 Fate (2001) directed by Zeki Demirkubuz
 Confession (2002) directed by Zeki Demirkubuz
 The Waiting Room (2003) directed by Zeki Demirkubuz
 Destiny (2005) directed by Zeki Demirkubuz

Chapter 5: New Istanbul Films
The new transitional genre of Istanbul Films, which offer alternative ways of seeing the city to its former privileged position in Turkish cinema, is discussed by the author, who claims that these films recycle and reuse traditional clichés about the city rather than negating them.

Filmography
 Somersault in a Coffin (1996) directed by Dervis Zaim
 Istanbul Tales (2005) directed by Selim Demirdelen, Kudret Sabancı, Ümit Ünal, Yücel Yolcu and Ömür Atay
 Head-On ( / , 2004) directed by Fatih Akın
 Crossing the Bridge: The Sound of Istanbul (2005) directed by Fatih Akın

Chapter 6: The Absent Women of New Turkish Cinema
The absence of women, a major defining characteristic of new Turkish cinema, is discussed by the author, who suggests this is shaped by an ambivalence of the filmmakers who subordinate women to men and deny them agency but have a critical self-awareness of their complicity with patriarchal society.

Filmography
 Vasfiye is Her Name (1985) directed by Atıf Yılmaz

Afterword
The author provides a general assessment of new Turkish cinema on the basis of the arguments in the preceding chapters.

References

External links
  from the publisher
 Turkey’s new wave cinema tackles difficult topics by Asmuan Suner on Today's Zaman

2010 non-fiction books